The Rain Children is a 2003 French and South Korean animated fantasy film directed by Philippe Leclerc. The plot is loosely inspired by Serge Brussolo's novel A l'image du dragon.

Plot 
Since the Great Sundering, the world has been divided into two parts : the land of fire, a vast desert inhabited by the people of the Pyross, and the land of water, inhabited by the Hydross. The Pyross have red skin, and stocky, muscular features; water burns their flesh and rain is lethal to them. They use sunstones (shining crystals) as both money and energy source. During the rainy season, they stay locked in their city of stone and cannot get out; they protect themselves from the rain and from the wild water dragons who wander into Pyross territory during the rainy season. The Hydross, on the other hand, have curvy features and blue or turquoise skin, and water is vital to them. In summer, the Hydross turn into stone statues and are thus vulnerable, while the Pyross can get out and venture into Hydross territory to destroy as many Hydross statues as they can before the rainy season starts again. The two people know very little about one another, and they cannot even touch one another, as the contact of Hydross skin burns the Pyross, and vice versa.

Peace between Hydross and Pyross seems impossible, but two young people, a Pyross named Skan and a young Hydross, Kallisto, meet one another in improbable circumstances and try desperately to stop the eternal war.

Production 
The setting and synopsis of the film were freely adapted from Serge Brussolo's novel À l'image du dragon, with a slightly lighter tone. The characters, backgrounds and general looks of the film were conceived by French illustrator and comic author Caza. The original soundtrack was composed by Didier Lockwood.

The film was presented at the Annecy International Animated Film Festival in 2003.

Release 
The DVD is distributed by MK2 Diffusion. It includes the original French version and an English dub.

External links 

2003 films
2003 animated films
2000s French animated films
2000s fantasy adventure films
Films based on fantasy novels
Films based on French novels
French animated fantasy films
2000s French-language films
South Korean animated fantasy films
French fantasy adventure films
South Korean fantasy adventure films
2000s French films
2000s South Korean films